The following Union and Confederate army units and commanders fought in the Battle of Franklin on April 10, 1863. Organization is compiled from the Official Records of the American Civil War.

For the Battle of Franklin fought on November 30, 1864 see: Battle of Franklin (1864) Union order of battle and Battle of Franklin (1864) Confederate order of battle.

Abbreviations used

Military Rank
 Gen = General
 LTG = Lieutenant General
 MG = Major General
 BG = Brigadier General
 Col = Colonel
 Ltc = Lieutenant Colonel
 Maj = Major
 Cpt = Captain
 Lt = Lieutenant

Other
 w = wounded
 mw = mortally wounded
 k = killed

Union

Army of Kentucky

MG Gordon Granger

Confederate

Cavalry Corps, Army of Tennessee
MG Earl Van Dorn

References 

American Civil War orders of battle